The Sony Cyber-shot DSC-RX100 IV is a digital premium compact camera announced by Sony on June 10, 2015. It is one of a pair of cameras launched together by Sony that use their new stacked CMOS sensor. The other camera is the Sony Cyber-shot DSC-RX10 II, a model providing a larger lens and greater zoom, but less compact body.

Compared to its predecessors, the RX100 IV also has a faster electronic shutter and increased read-out speed for video, which will also result in a reduction in rolling shutter effect and allow high speed video to be captured.

The camera was succeeded by the RX100 V which improved upon some of the issues such as buffer and heating that the RX100 IV suffered from particularly in recording video

References

RX100 IV
Cameras introduced in 2015